Posen Township may refer to the following placed in the United States:

 Posen Township, Michigan
 Posen Township, Yellow Medicine County, Minnesota

See also
 Posen (disambiguation)

Township name disambiguation pages